Jaime Astrain Aguado (born 5 February 1988) is a Spanish footballer who plays as a central defender.

Football career
Astrain was born in Madrid. He spent the vast majority of his career in the lower leagues.

Astrain's professional input consisted of 70 minutes in a 1–0 away win against Real Murcia in the second round of the Copa del Rey, while in representation of Córdoba CF. He had signed for the Segunda División club in June 2011.

References

External links

1988 births
Living people
Footballers from Madrid
Spanish footballers
Association football defenders
Segunda División B players
Tercera División players
CD Móstoles footballers
Villarreal CF C players
CA Osasuna B players
Córdoba CF players
Écija Balompié players
FC Cartagena footballers
Real Jaén footballers